Yerphal Caves, also Yerphale Caves, are a small group of Buddhist caves located near Umbraj, Maharashtra, India. The caves were only discovered recently, in 1979. It is located not far from the Karad Caves (about 25 km).

The group contains a small chaitya hall with an apsidal plan with a stupa inside. There are also two cells, and an unfinished cave. The caves can be dated to the first half of the 2nd century CE.

References

Buddhist caves in India
Caves of Maharashtra
Indian rock-cut architecture
Former populated places in India
Buddhist pilgrimage sites in India
Buddhist monasteries in India
Buddhist temples in India
Stupas in India
Caves containing pictograms in India
Tourist attractions in Ratnagiri district